Juan Miguel Moreno (born April 1, 1971) is an American taekwondo practitioner. He is a three-time Olympian (1988, 1992, 2000) and two-time Olympic silver medalist (1988 and 1992).

After retiring from competition, Moreno served as the National Team Coach in 2002 for the World Cup and 2002 Junior World Championships. Moreno also coached at the 2005 World Taekwondo Championships.

References

American sportspeople of Mexican descent
American male taekwondo practitioners
Taekwondo practitioners at the 1988 Summer Olympics
Taekwondo practitioners at the 1992 Summer Olympics
1971 births
Living people
Place of birth missing (living people)
Medalists at the 1992 Summer Olympics
Medalists at the 1988 Summer Olympics
Pan American Games gold medalists for the United States
Olympic silver medalists for the United States in taekwondo
Pan American Games medalists in taekwondo
Taekwondo practitioners at the 1991 Pan American Games
Medalists at the 1991 Pan American Games
20th-century American people